Anbar is a small village in the Swabi District of Khyber Pakhtunkhwa in Pakistan. It is located at 34 02 50 N and 72 24 40 E at an altitude of 1010 ft. The Swabi Interchange is located in Anbar village and is the central location for the motorway connecting Punjab and Khyber Pakhtunkhwa.

Overview 
The people belong to the Aba Khel sub-tribe of the Mandanr Yusafzai tribe. The people belong to Bular Khel (First settled in Anbar) Shamshi Khel and  Tajukhel caste which is considered the most honourable caste among Pakhtoons. However, the Malyar Pashtoon tribe is increasing in number due to high the birth rate. The last 50 years more than one hundred jadoon families live in Ambar.

Education 
The Ambar populace is highly educated, with a literacy rate of 90%. In 2012, the Government of Khyber Pakhtunkhwa inaugurated University of Swabi at Ambar. The university campus is spread over 200 kanals and is the first public sector university in Swabi. 

Ambar also contains two segregated elementary colleges, one for boys and one for girls. The village is transforming to a commercial town with each passing year due to construction of motorway interchange.

Sports 
Anbar fields teams on the district level for cricket and volleyball, with its volleyball team holding several provincial championships. Its cricket team is also ranked at the top on district level.

See also 
 University of Swabi
 Swabi District

References 

Populated places in Swabi District